Mtubatuba is an administrative area in the Umkhanyakude District of KwaZulu-Natal in South Africa.

Main places
The 2001 census divided the municipality into the following main places:

Politics 

The municipal council consists of forty-five members elected by mixed-member proportional representation. Twenty-three councillors are elected by first-past-the-post voting in twenty-three wards, while the remaining twenty-two are chosen from party lists so that the total number of party representatives is proportional to the number of votes received. 

In the election of 1 November 2021 no party obtained a majority. The Inkatha Freedom Party (IFP) received the most seats with nineteen. An IFP-led executive was elected on 3 February 2022.

The following table shows the results of the election.

References

External links
 Official Website

Local municipalities of the Umkhanyakude District Municipality